HNLMS De Ruyter may refer to one of nine ships of the Royal Netherlands Navy named after Admiral Michiel Adriaenszoon de Ruyter (1607–1676):

 , was a 68-gun frigate that the British Royal Navy captured in 1799 and took into service as a storeship. She was on her way to Falmouth, Jamaica, to serve as a prison hulk when a hurricane in September 1804 caused her to ground, wrecking her.
 , was a 54-gun frigate converted to steam power and then into a broadside ironclad in 1863
 , was an  unprotected cruiser
 , was a 
She was renamed Van Ghent to make way for the 1935 De Ruyter. She served in World War II and was wrecked on Bamidjo reef on 15 February 1942
 , was a unique light cruiser. She served in World War II and was sunk in the battle of the Java Sea on 28 February 1942.
She was sold to Peru in 1973 and renamed Almirante Grau
 , was a  guided missile frigate
 , launched in 2002, is a 

Royal Netherlands Navy ship names